Petr Packert (22 February 1943 – 23 April 2003) was a Czech footballer and football manager.

He played for Dukla Prague, Bohemians Prague and TJ Modřany.

He coached Czechoslovakia U-16, Czechoslovakia U-18, Czechoslovakia U-21, OFI Crete, Panathinaikos, Ethnikos Piraeus, PAS Giannina, Bohemians Prague, Pagkorinthiakos, Tatran Poštorná and ES Sétif.

References

1943 births
2003 deaths
Czech footballers
Czechoslovak footballers
Dukla Prague footballers
Czech football managers
Czechoslovak football managers
Panathinaikos F.C. managers
PAS Giannina F.C. managers
OFI Crete F.C. managers
Footballers from Prague
Expatriate football managers in Algeria
Ethnikos Piraeus F.C. managers
ES Sétif managers
Expatriate football managers in Greece
Czechoslovak expatriate sportspeople in Greece
Czech expatriate sportspeople in Greece
Czech expatriate sportspeople in Algeria
Bohemians 1905 managers
Association football midfielders
Bohemians 1905 players
Czech expatriate football managers